Qarabağlı (also, Karabagly) is a village and municipality in the Salyan Rayon of Azerbaijan.  It has a population of 5,377.  The municipality consists of the villages of Qarabağlı and Kolanı.

References 

Populated places in Salyan District (Azerbaijan)